Oktyabrsky is a rural locality (a settlement) in Ivanovskoye Rural Settlement, Vashkinsky District, Vologda Oblast, Russia. The population was 268 as of 2002. There are 5 streets.

Geography 
Oktyabrsky is located 57 km northeast of Lipin Bor (the district's administrative centre) by road. Pervomaysky is the nearest rural locality.

References 

Rural localities in Vashkinsky District